Jharuwarashi is a village development committee in Lalitpur District in the Bagmati Zone of central Nepal. According to 2001 Nepal census, it had a population of 3185 living in 586 individual households.

The village is located some 8 kilometers away from Patan, Nepal and 12 kilometers away from the capital city, Kathmandu.
Santaneshwor Mahadev temple is one of the popular religious destinations for Hindu devotees. There is a large horde of devotees in the month of January and February to worship God Shiva.

References

External links

UN map of the municipalities of Lalitpur District

Populated places in Lalitpur District, Nepal